The Fox family is a noble family of England that held the title of Baron Holland from 7 March 1762 when it was created for Lady Caroline Fox until 18 December 1859 upon the death of Henry Fox, who died without living issue leading to the title becoming extinct. The family has held the title of Earl of Ilchester since its creation for Stephen Fox in 1756.

Princess Marie of Liechtenstein, the adopted daughter of the last Baron Holland, was a member of the family.

Family tree 

 
Family trees